Ursule Molinaro (1916, Paris –10 July 2000, New York City) was a prolific novelist, playwright, translator and visual artist, the author of 12 novels, two collections of short prose works, innumerable short stories for literary magazines and dozens of translations from the French and German. She lived and wrote in French in Paris until shortly after World War II, when she went to New York in 1949 to work as a multilingual proofreader for the newly formed United Nations. Just a few years later, having realized that she would stay in the United States, she made the decision to systematically retrain herself not only to write, but to dream, think, and speak, in the language of her new soil. In the latter part of her life, she developed a method for teaching creative writing that relied wholly upon the oral and taught creative writing at several universities and in her home until her death in 2000.

Ideals
Molinaro's texts attempt to fulfill a Nietzschian ideal. They hinge on the belief that there is a human supra-psychology that transcends nationality, gender, psychosexual archetypes, and individual linguistic heritages. Using a vast battery of unusual and privileged literary tools, she hoped to arrive at a new set of universals by the stringent crafting of razor-sharp narratives, which come to merciless, acerbic conclusions about culture and go so far as to radically reinterpret Greek myth.

Career
Molinaro was a linguist and a world traveler and a woman who participated in the artistic milieus of late Modernist Paris, Abstract Expressionist and then Off-Off Broadway New York, London, Rome, Lisbon, and provincial America. She was fluent in English, French, German, Italian, Spanish, and Greek. Her English was slightly and delightfully accented, while German and French were her native tongues.

In 1958, she was co-founder and fiction editor of Chelsea magazine.

Style and themes
Like Vladimir Nabokov, Molinaro was a fully realized transplanted writer. She wrote mostly about the immediate experiences and situations of her characters, who would resort to memory only as a repository of regrets and mistakes or as a grim tale of something that had to be escaped.
	
Molinaro's novels often portrayed women with a disregard for the exigencies of their social situation: In The Autobiography of Cassandra, Priestess and Prophetess of Troy, her most blatantly feminist novel, the prophetess relates her own doom and oppression from a privileged psychic level---that of a person who is dead. What Cassandra tells is not only the story of power robbed from women but also the shoddy treatment civilizations inflict upon the visionary, who is often an artist. 
	
In her novel Fat Skeletons, a translator wary of serving unappreciative publishers attempts to pass her own novel off as a translation. In the Old Moon with the New Moon in Its Arms, a patrician poet of ancient Greece scandalizes her parents by offering herself as a religious sacrifice. It is a self-destructive gesture that rejects birth and family, yet reaches out to a larger kind of social and spiritual truth.

Molinaro's greatest theme is the existential ability of the individual to remake herself. In her fiction, her characters fall into two types: insular, fiercely independent people whose entire identity has been self-created by the exercise of will—usually with a flouting disregard for convention or tradition—and people who are comically mired and rooted in their own pasts, a fact that usually makes them laughable, self-righteous clichés.

Translations
Molinaro translated many texts from French and German. In collaboration with the German expatriate Hedwig Rappolt she translated Christa Wolf's novel Kindheitsmuster (Patterns of Childhood). 
On several of her translations, she collaborated with her close friend, the writer Bruce Benderson, who now serves as her literary executor. Molinaro also subtitled a number of films including Une femme mariée (Jean-Luc Godard, 1964) and Le Bonheur (Agnès Varda, 1965).

Personal beliefs
Molinaro's emphasis on the self-created individual set her against family values and procreation. She saw the family as a prison and childhood as a long period of bitter incarceration that provides no basis for true identity but is rather a powerful force that seeks to inhibit it. She believed that such a prison could be escaped by an act of the will, through clear-sightedness, linguistic prowess and the development of deep reflection. Her texts, which often employed unusual spacing between words and lines as a means to create spoken rhythms, could not have been written without her wide experience as a translator and linguist. She believed that truth could be captured in the careful crafting of language and that no human experience was beyond the power of language.

Painting
Molinaro was also a painter in the style of the Haitian primitives. She was deeply interested in astrology and numerology and wrote two books (The Zodiac Lovers; Life by the Numbers) on these subjects.

Books

Fiction
Green Lights Are Blue. New York: New American Library, 1967.
Sounds of a Drunken Summer. New York: Harper & Row, 1969.
The Borrower. New York: Harper & Row, 1970.
Encores for a Dilettante. New York: Fiction Collective, 1977.
Bastards: Footnotes to History New Paltz, NY: Treacle Press 1979. Published in paperback and 50 numbered and signed clothbound copies.
The Autobiography of Cassandra, Princess & Prophetess of Troy. Canbury, CT: Archer, 1979; Kingston, NY: McPherson, 1992.
Positions with White Roses. Kingston, NY: McPherson, 1983.
Thirteen Stories. Kingston, NY: McPherson, 1989.
A Full Moon of Women. New York: Dutton, 1990.
The New Moon with the Old Moon in Her Arms. London: Women's Press, 1990; Kingston, NY: McPherson, 1993.
Fat Skeletons. London: Serif, 1993.
Power Dreamers: The Jocasta Complex. Kingston, NY: McPherson, 1994.
Demons & Divas: 3 Novels. Kingston, NY: McPherson, 1999.
Sweet Cheat of Freedom, Analects of Self-Contempt, Top Stories, New York, 1983

Non-fiction
The Zodiac Lovers: New York: Avon, 1969.
Life by the Numbers: New York: William Morrow, 1971.

References

"Ursule Molinaro" by Bruce Benderson. In The Review of Contemporary Fiction, Spring 2002, Vol XXII, No. 1.

External links 
 Ursule Molinaro Papers, Fales Library and Special Collections at New York University

1916 births
2000 deaths
20th-century American novelists
American women novelists
American women dramatists and playwrights
20th-century American women writers
20th-century American dramatists and playwrights
20th-century American translators
American subtitlers
French emigrants to the United States